
Gmina Barlinek is an urban-rural gmina (administrative district) in Myślibórz County, West Pomeranian Voivodeship, in north-western Poland.

The gmina contains part of the protected area called Barlinek-Gorzów Landscape Park.

Villages
Apart from the town of Barlinek, Gmina Barlinek contains the villages and settlements of Brunki, Dziedzice, Dzikówko, Dzikowo, Golejewo, Janowo, Jaromierki, Jarząbki, Kornatka, Kryń, Krzepinek, Krzynka, Laskówko, Łubianka, Lubie, Luśno, Lutówko, Lutowo, Moczkowo, Moczydło, Mostkowo, Niepołcko, Nierybno, Niewstąp, Nowa Dziedzina, Ogard, Okno, Okunie, Osina, Ożar, Parsko, Piaśnik, Płonno, Podębie, Podgórze, Prądno, Przymiarki, Pustać, Rówienko, Równo, Rychnów, Rychnówek, Sitno, Słonki, Stara Dziedzina, Strąpie, Sucha, Swadzim, Trzebin, Uklejka, Więcław, Wierzchno, Wiewiórki, Żelice and Żydowo.

Neighbouring gminas
Gmina Barlinek is bordered by the gminas of Dolice, Kłodawa, Lipiany, Myślibórz, Nowogródek Pomorski, Pełczyce, Przelewice and Strzelce Krajeńskie.

References
Polish official population figures 2006

Barlinek
Myślibórz County

de:Barlinek#Gemeinde